Talu Na Mohra is a town in the Islamabad Capital Territory of Pakistan. It is located at 33° 26' 45N 73° 27' 15E with an altitude of 561 metres (1843 feet).

References 

Union councils of Islamabad Capital Territory